The 2014–15 FIS Ski Jumping World Cup was the 36th World Cup season in ski jumping for men, the 18th official World Cup season in ski flying and the 4th World Cup season for ladies. It began on 22 November 2014 and ended on 22 March 2015 in Planica, Slovenia. A break took place during the season in February for the FIS Nordic World Ski Championships 2015 in Falun, Sweden.

The defending champions from the previous season were Kamil Stoch from Poland, Peter Prevc from Slovenia as defending ski flying champion, and Sara Takanashi from Japan.

The 63rd Four Hills Tournament offered extra prize money. Stefan Kraft of Austria won the tournament for the first time, followed by Michael Hayböck of Austria and Peter Prevc.

February 2015 saw an improvement of the world record in ski jumping distance.

Peter Prevc and Jurij Tepeš became the sixth and seventh man in ski jumping history to achieve a "perfect jump", with all five judges awarding them top style marks (5x20). This took place in Planica on 20 March (Prevc) and 22 March (Tepeš).

Severin Freund became the World Cup winner for the first time. Freund and Prevc ended the season with the identical number of points but Freund was awarded the title on the basis of higher number of victories during the season (9 for Freund and 3 for Prevc). Prevc defended the Ski flying title and Germany won the Nations cup.

In ladies' World cup Daniela Iraschko-Stolz won her first overall title and Austria won their first Nations cup.

World records

Season titles

Map of world cup hosts 
All 25 locations hosting world cup events for men (21) and ladies (8) in this season. Events in Liberec were canceled.

 Four Hills Tournament

Calendar

Men 

Only single-round competitions were held in Lillehammer, Nizhny Tagil, Wisła and Kuopio. The second round in each was cancelled due to strong wind.

Ladies 

Only one round competition in Zaō and Râșnov.

Men's team 

Only one round competition in Planica team event. Second round cancelled because of strong wind.

Men's standings

Overall

Nations Cup

Prize money

Four Hills Tournament

Ski Flying

Ladies' standings

Overall

Nations Cup

Prize money

Achievements
First World Cup career victory
 Roman Koudelka (25), in his 9th season – the WC 1 in Klingenthal; first podium was 2010-11 WC 13 in Harrachov
 Špela Rogelj (20), in her 4th season – the WC 1 in Lillehammer
 Anders Fannemel (23), in his 5th season – the WC 6 in Nizhny Tagil; first podium was 2012-13 WC 2 in Lillehammer
 Stefan Kraft (21), in his 4th season – the WC 10 in Oberstdorf; first podium was 2012-13 WC 11 in Bischofshofen
 Michael Hayböck (23), in his 6th season – the WC 13 in Bischofshofen; first podium was 2013-14 WC 15 in Wisla
 Carina Vogt (22), in her 4th season – the WC 4 in Zaō; first podium was 2012-13 WC 11 in Zaō

First World Cup podium
 Špela Rogelj (20), in her 4th season 
 Chiara Hölzl (17), in her 3rd season - no. 3 in the WC 3 in Sapporo
 Taylor Henrich (19), in her 4th season - no. 3 in the WC 6 in Oberstdorf
 Johann André Forfang (19), in his 1st season - no. 3 in the WC 24 in Vikersund

Victory in this World Cup (in brackets victory for all time)
 Severin Freund - 9 (18) first place
 Sara Takanashi - 6 (30) first place
 Daniela Iraschko-Stolz - 5 (10) first place
 Roman Koudelka - 4 (4) first place
 Peter Prevc - 3 (6) first place
 Stefan Kraft - 3 (3) first place
 Simon Ammann - 2 (23) first place
 Kamil Stoch - 2 (15) first place
 Richard Freitag - 2 (5) first place
 Carina Vogt - 2 (2) first place
 Anders Fannemel - 2 (2) first place
 Gregor Schlierenzauer - 1 (53) first place
 Noriaki Kasai - 1 (17) first place
 Anders Jacobsen - 1 (10) first place
 Jurij Tepeš - 1 (2) first place
 Špela Rogelj - 1 (1) first place
 Michael Hayböck - 1 (1) first place

Footnotes

References 

World cup
World cup
FIS Ski Jumping World Cup